David Dominic Cortese (born June 3, 1956) is an elected official from San Jose, California. He is currently serving in the California State Senate, representing District 15, which encompasses a majority of Santa Clara County. Before being elected to the California State Senate, Cortese served on the Santa Clara County Board of Supervisors for 12 years, as a Councilmember and Vice Mayor for the City of San Jose for eight years, and for eight years as a trustee for the East Side Union High School District in San Jose.  Cortese ran for mayor of San Jose and won the primary, losing the general election to District 3 councilmember Sam Liccardo.

Dave Cortese won a seat on the Santa Clara County Board of Supervisors in 2008 with 56,845 votes, or 54.87%. He was reelected to the Santa Clara County Board of Supervisors in 2012 with 40,360 votes, or 100%.

In his term on the Santa Clara County Board of Supervisors, his accomplishments include securing funding for more school crossing guards and an evaluation of "hot spots" of pedestrian and bicycle accidents and fatalities in order to improve conditions. He helped form an anti-Human Trafficking task force by sponsoring an $850,000 budget item. The money is evenly divided between the Sheriff's Office and the District Attorney's office, which make up the task force with multiple other local agencies. As of October 1, 2014 the task force showed measurable results according to Santa Clara County Sheriff Laurie Smith.

In his first term on the Board of Supervisors, his accomplishments included securing funding for transportation projects, including the Silicon Valley BART Extension; upgrades to the county's expressway system; extending VTA Light Rail to Eastridge Mall;  improvements to HWY 101 and the Tully Road, Capitol Expressway, and Yerba Buena interchanges; approving a new ambulance service; and protecting farmland and open space, as well as introducing new Sunshine Laws.

Cortese attended Bellarmine College Preparatory high school (1970–1974).  He received his bachelor's degree from the University of California, Davis and graduated from Lincoln Law School (1991–1995).

He is the son of former Santa Clara County Supervisor and California Assembly member Dominic L. Cortese and Suzanne Cortese. Cortese's paternal grandfather, Vince Cortese Sr., was an immigrant farmer from Sicily who found success in agriculture and commercial development.  His maternal grandfather, Ed Donovan, was a civic leader and executive of General Motors Credit Corp. who served as a Santa Clara city councilman in 1949 and 1950. Dave Cortese has a wife, Pattie, who serves on the East Side Union High School District Board, and four children.

Gun control
At the initiative of Cortese, the Santa Clara County Board of Supervisors unanimously approved an ordinance to force gun owners to lock and secure their firearms in homes in unincorporated Santa Clara County.
At the initiative of Cortese, the Santa Clara County Board of Supervisors approved moving forward with a plan for residents to voluntarily rid their homes of unwanted firearms and to educate the public about the process.

See also
2006 San Jose mayoral election
2014 San Jose mayoral election

References

External links
Official website
Santa Clara County D3 website

Join California Dave Cortese

1956 births
Living people
University of California, Davis alumni
Lincoln Law School of San Jose alumni
San Jose City Council members
County supervisors in California
Democratic Party California state senators
Continental Basketball Association executives
21st-century American politicians